The 1997 Honduran Supercup was held between winners of 1996–97 Honduran Liga Nacional (Olimpia) and 1996 Honduran Cup (Platense) resulting in the Lions as winners.  It was the first ever contested Honduran Supercup.

Qualified teams

The game

See also
 1997–98 Honduran Liga Nacional

References

Honduran Supercup
Super Cup